James R. Buck (born July 30, 1945 in Logansport, Indiana) is a member of the Indiana State Senate representing the 21st district. He is also the current chairman of the American Legislative Exchange Council (ALEC).

References

External links
James Buck at Ballotpedia
Project Vote Smart – Senator James R. Buck (IN) profile
Our Campaigns – Senator James R. Buck (IN) profile
State Senator James R. Buck official Indiana State Legislature site
 

1945 births
Republican Party Indiana state senators
Living people
21st-century American politicians
2020 United States presidential electors